Southern Fried Chicken, is a British-based fast food outlet headquartered in Reading, England. It operates a franchise network in the United Kingdom and worldwide. Southern Fried Chicken has 93 locations in 15 countries.

History 
Southern Fried Chicken was founded in the 1970s by Arthur Withers. In 1973, Withers travelled to America to work for Barbeque King; there, he improved his knowledge of the commercial fast food business. Withers made a visit to Greenville, South Carolina, where he learned about fried chicken. 

In 1983, Southern Fried Chicken moved into the offices they are still in today, complete with its own manufacturing department.

In 1999, Southern Fried Chicken met an Alendvic Company and started to expand the love of fried chicken in Russia, starting in the Perm region. The Perm region now has over 25 outlets. 

The company is currently headed by his son, Andrew Withers.

Outlets 

Southern Fried Chicken is currently sold in over 700 locations, across over 79 countries worldwide. Restaurants have schemed interior designs and have been applied to create clean, spacious and comfortable restaurants. Designs are suited to all types of premises and existing architecture.

Southern Fried Chicken operates in areas that cover Europe, Arabia, Mena regions, Africa and South America; as well as India, which includes the Asia-Pac regions. They are also making the first steps to reach the Chinese Market.

The most recent outlet openings include Hyderabad and Mongolia as well as having existing franchises in Senegal and Malta and a mobile unit in Martinique and Central African Republic.

Undercover Boss 
In July 2011, Andrew Withers took part in the Channel 4 documentary series Undercover Boss, where he went undercover to work at various franchises in the United Kingdom.

References

External links 
 

Chicken chains of the United Kingdom
Fast-food chains of the United Kingdom
Fast-food poultry restaurants
Fast-food franchises
Companies based in Reading, Berkshire
British companies established in 1970
Restaurants established in 1970
1970 establishments in England